Collesalvetti is a comune (municipality) in the Province of Livorno in the Italian region Tuscany, located about  southwest of Florence,  northeast of Livorno and only  south from Pisa.

Geography
Collesalvetti borders the following municipalities: Cascina, Crespina, Fauglia, Livorno, Orciano Pisano, Pisa, Rosignano Marittimo.

Government

Frazioni 
The comune is formed by the municipal seat of Collesalvetti and the frazioni – towns and villages – of Castell'Anselmo, Colognole, Guasticce, Nugola, Parrana San Martino, Parrana San Giusto, Stagno and Vicarello. The hamlet of Mortaiolo is also included in the municipality.

Twin towns
Collesalvetti is twinned with:

 Garching an der Alz, Germany, since 2003

References

External links
 Official website

Cities and towns in Tuscany